Decoration Day is an American drama television film that premiered on NBC on December 2, 1990, as part of the Hallmark Hall of Fame anthology series. It is directed by Robert Markowitz and written by Robert W. Lenski, based on the novella of the same name by John William Corrington. The film stars James Garner, Judith Ivey, Bill Cobbs, Ruby Dee, and Laurence Fishburne. It follows Albert Sidney Finch, a retired Georgia judge deciding to help his boyhood friend, a black World War II veteran from whom Finch has been estranged for 30 years.

The film won two Golden Globe Awards, for Best Miniseries or Television Film and Best Actor in a Miniseries or Television Film for Garner. It also earned six Primetime Emmy Award nominations, including Outstanding Drama/Comedy Special and Miniseries, with Dee winning Outstanding Supporting Actress in a Miniseries or a Special for her performance as Rowena, Finch's longtime housekeeper.

Plot
James Garner plays a retired judge and recluse who comes out of "hiding" to investigate when his childhood friend (Bill Cobbs) refuses to accept a Medal of Honor awarded decades ago in World War II.  His reason is kept in confidence and Garner's character files a motion to deny the ceremony.  Meanwhile, the personal lives of the other characters have issues of their own to work out.  In the end of things Cobbs' character is told of something he didn't know about and the two romantic side stories resolve in a positive fashion.

Cast
 James Garner as Albert Sidney Finch
 Judith Ivey as Terry Novis
 Bill Cobbs as Gee Pennywell
 Ruby Dee as Rowena
 Laurence Fishburne as Michael Waring
 Jo Anderson as Loreen Wendell
 Norm Skaggs as Billy Wendell
 Wallace Wilkinson as Judge Wesley
 Ric Reitz as Young Albert
 Jonathan Peck as Young Gee

Reception

Critical response
John J. O'Connor of The New York Times wrote: "Directed with all deliberate thoughtfulness by Robert Markowitz, Decoration Day proceeds without fireworks, taking its time and carefully revealing its gentle insights into memory, friendship, race relations and the simple fact that time passes and things change. Surrounded by an impeccable supporting cast, Mr. Garner brings to television still another uncommonly fine performance." Ken Tucker of Entertainment Weekly gave the film an A−, saying it "starts out like the ultimate Hallmark Hall of Fame, a video greeting card designed to warm your heart. But very quickly it becomes something better than that." Tucker also called it a "shrewdly conceived drama." Tom Shales of The Washington Post described Decoration Day as a "dreary tear-jerker," and opined that it "serves up a powerful load of mush, much mushier than it is powerful." Shales also wrote: "Director Robert Markowitz succeeds at making the slow pace work for the story and the bucolic Georgia setting, but he can't do much about the script's tiring talkiness. When the words get to be too much, he sends Garner off to the lake to ponder the meaning of it all." Ray Loynd of the Los Angeles Times stated that the film "certainly unfurls the Hallmark banner: an intelligent script, a measured rather than aggressive tone, and the affirmation of loyalty, heroism and, in this case, the restorative powers of memory (fluidly captured in flashbacks, including German war scenes)."

Accolades

References

External links
 
 

1990 films
1990 drama films
1990 television films
1990s American films
1990s English-language films
American drama television films
Best Miniseries or Television Movie Golden Globe winners
Cultural depictions of judges
Films about cancer in the United States
Films about friendship
Films about race and ethnicity
Films about racism in the United States
Films about widowhood in the United States
Films based on American novels
Films directed by Robert Markowitz
Films scored by Patrick Williams
Films set in 1975
Films set in Georgia (U.S. state)
Films shot in Georgia (U.S. state)
Films shot in Newnan, Georgia
Hallmark Hall of Fame episodes
NBC network original films
Television films based on books